Sherill Shavette Baker (born December 3, 1982) is a current American collegiate women's basketball assistant head coach with the Georgia State Panthers and former professional women's basketball player in the WNBA, most recently with the Detroit Shock.

Baker attended Greater Atlanta Christian School, then attended college at the University of Georgia and graduated in 2006. Following her collegiate career, she was selected 12th overall in the 2006 WNBA Draft by the New York Liberty and traded to the Los Angeles Sparks on June 20, 2007, in exchange for Lisa Willis.

She signed with the Indiana Fever on May 22, 2008.

She played for Ramla in Israel during the 2007–08 WNBA off-season. She then spent the 2008-09 off-season in Israel again, this time for Ashdod.

College statistics
Source

See also
 List of NCAA Division I women's basketball career steals leaders

References

External links
Kennesaw State Owls coach bio
Auburn Tigers coach bio
WNBA Player Profile
WNBA stats

1982 births
Living people
American expatriate basketball people in Cyprus
American expatriate basketball people in France
American expatriate basketball people in Germany
American expatriate basketball people in Israel
American expatriate basketball people in Italy
American women's basketball coaches
American women's basketball players
Auburn Tigers women's basketball coaches
Basketball players from Atlanta
Detroit Shock players
Georgia Lady Bulldogs basketball players
Indiana Fever players
Los Angeles Sparks players
New York Liberty draft picks
New York Liberty players
Shooting guards
ŽKK Novi Zagreb players